Ahmed Raza can refer to:

 Ahmed Raza Khan Barelvi (17th century scholar and theologian from India). 
 Ahmed Raza Chuhdary (Pakistani entrepreneur, CEO Thear). 
 Ahmed Raza Khan (Pakistani politician, former Member of the Provincial Assembly of Punjab). 
 Ahmad Raza Khan Kasuri (Pakistani politician, former Member of the National Assembly of Pakistan). 
 Ahmed Raza Khan (Pakistani cricketer). 
 Ahmed Raza (Emirati cricketer). 
 Ahmed Raza (Bangladeshi cricketer). 
 Ahmed Raza (Pakistani cricketer). 
 Ahmed Raza (general), born 1910, an Indian-born cricketer and army general

References